Ireland competed at the 2014 Winter Olympics in Sochi, Russia from 7 to 23 February 2014. Five competitors in four sports made up the Ireland team. All five members of the team are members of the Irish diaspora, who were born or live and train elsewhere.

Alpine skiing 

According to the final quota allocation released on January 20, 2014, Ireland had two athletes in qualification position.

Cross-country skiing 

According to the quota allocation released on January 20, 2014, Ireland had one athlete in qualification position.

Skeleton 

Ireland has qualified one athlete for the men's single event. Sean Greenwood originally competed for Canada but switched to compete for Ireland to pay homage to his heritage.

Snowboarding 

According to the quota allocation released on January 20, 2014, Ireland had one athlete qualified in two events.

Qualification Legend: QF – Qualify directly to final; QS – Qualify to semifinal

See also
Ireland at the 2014 Summer Youth Olympics

References

External links 
 
 

Nations at the 2014 Winter Olympics
2014 Winter Olympics
Olympics